Bessarabka is a name for localities used in Kazakhstan, Moldova, Russia and Ukraine. The etymology of places named like this comes from the region of Bessarabia.


Ukraine
 Besarabka (Kyiv), a historical neighbourhood in Kyiv
 Besarabsky Market, an indoor market in Kyiv
 Bessarabska Square, Kyiv

Villages
 Bessarabka (Novoazovskyi Raion), a village in Novoazovskyi Raion of Donetsk Oblast
 Bessarabka (Berezanskyi Raion), a village in Berezanskyi Raion of Mykolaiv Oblast
 Bessarabka (Velykomykhailivskyi Raion), a village in Velykomykhailivskyi Raion of Odessa Oblast
 Bessarabka (Роменський район), a village in Romenskyi Raion of Sumy Oblast

Russia
 Bessarabka (Petropavlovsky District), a village in Petropavlovsky District, Voronezh Oblast

Kazakhstan 
 Saryqobda, a village in Aktobe Region, known as Bessarabka until 1993

Moldova
 Basarabeasca, a city and capital of the Raionul Basarabeasca
 Raionul Basarabeasca, a raion (district) of Moldova